Akram Zuway (born 24 December 1991), is a Libyan footballer who plays for Kazma as a striker.

International career

International goals
Scores and results list Libya's goal tally first.

Honours

Al-Faisaly
Jordan Premier League:1
 2016–17
Jordan FA Cup:1
 2016–17
Arab club championship 2017
second place

Individual records
Top Goalscorer Jordan Premier League 2015–16 (12 goals)

References

External links

Living people
Libya international footballers
Libyan expatriate footballers
Expatriate footballers in Jordan
Expatriate footballers in Qatar
Al-Hussein SC (Irbid) players
1991 births
Libyan footballers
Association football forwards
Expatriate footballers in Egypt
Al-Faisaly SC players
Al-Hilal SC (Benghazi) players
Al-Markhiya SC players
Libyan expatriate sportspeople in Egypt
Libyan expatriate sportspeople in Jordan
Libyan expatriate sportspeople in Qatar
Kazma SC players
Libyan expatriate sportspeople in Kuwait
Expatriate footballers in Kuwait
Kuwait Premier League players
Libyan Premier League players